The Cinema of Yugoslavia were the films produced in Yugoslavia.

Overview

The Socialist Federal Republic of Yugoslavia had an internationally acclaimed film industry. Yugoslavia submitted many films to the Academy Award for Best Foreign Language Film, six of which were nominated. Film companies included Jadran Film from Zagreb, SR Croatia; Avala Film from Belgrade, SR Serbia; Sutjeska film and Studio film from Sarajevo, SR Bosnia and Herzegovina; Zeta film from Budva, SR Montenegro; Vardar film and Makedonija film from Skopje, SR Macedonia, Triglav Film from Ljubljana, SR Slovenia and others.

Prominent male actors included Danilo Stojković, Ljuba Tadić, Bekim Fehmiu, Fabijan Šovagović, Mustafa Nadarević, Bata Živojinović, Boris Dvornik, Ljubiša Samardžić, Dragan Nikolić and Rade Šerbedžija, while Milena Dravić, Neda Arnerić, Mira Furlan and Ena Begović were notable actresses. Acclaimed film directors included: Emir Kusturica, Dušan Makavejev, Goran Marković, Lordan Zafranović, Goran Paskaljević, Živojin Pavlović and Hajrudin Krvavac. Many Yugoslav films featured eminent foreign actors such as Orson Welles and Yul Brynner in the Academy Award nominated The Battle of Neretva, and Richard Burton in Sutjeska. Also, many foreign films were shot on locations in Yugoslavia including domestic crews, such as Force 10 from Navarone starring Harrison Ford, Robert Shaw and Franco Nero, Armour of God starring Jackie Chan, as well as Escape from Sobibor starring Alan Arkin, Joanna Pacuła and Rutger Hauer.
Pula Film Festival was a notable film festival.

Partisan film is a subgenre of war films, made in Yugoslavia during the 1960s, 1970s and 1980s. In the broadest sense, main characteristics of partisan films are that they are set in Yugoslavia during World War II and have partisans as main protagonists, while antagonists are Axis forces and their collaborators. Outside Yugoslavia, Partisan films were especially popular in China.

The Yugoslav Film Archive was a founding member of the International Federation of Film Archives and was the national film library of the former Yugoslavia, founded in 1949 in Belgrade.

Films

Battle of Neretva
Battle of Sutjeska
Walter Defends Sarajevo
Do You Remember Dolly Bell?
Ko to tamo peva
The Bridge (1969 film)
Lude godine
The Marathon Family
Time of the Gypsies
Tko pjeva zlo ne misli
When Father Was Away on Business
I Even Met Happy Gypsies

Co-production:

Kelly's Heroes
Captain America (1990 film)
Armour of God
A Corpse Hangs in the Web
Le Prix du Danger
High Road to China
Transylvania 6-5000 (1985 film)
Genghis Khan (1965 film)
The Trial (1962 film)
W.R.: Mysteries of the Organism
The Long Ships (film)
Taras Bulba (1962 film)
Escape from Sobibor
Score (1974 film)
Old Shatterhand (film)
Winnetou film series
Kapò
Man and Beast
Destination Death

Television
Top lista nadrealista

See also
Lists of Yugoslav films
Cinema of Bosnia and Herzegovina
Cinema of Croatia
Cinema of Montenegro
Cinema of North Macedonia
Cinema of Serbia
Cinema of Slovenia

Further reading

External links

 
Cinema of Serbia
Cinema of Croatia
Cinema of Bosnia and Herzegovina
Cinema of North Macedonia
Cinema of Slovenia
Cinema of Montenegro